The 1998 UEFA Cup Final was a football match played at Parc des Princes in Paris on 6 May 1998 between two Italian sides, Lazio and Internazionale. Inter won the match 3–0. It was the first single-legged UEFA Cup final.

Route to the final

Match

Details

See also
1997–98 UEFA Cup
Inter Milan in European football
Italian football clubs in international competitions
S.S. Lazio in European football

References

2
International club association football competitions hosted by Paris
UEFA Cup Final 1998
UEFA Cup Final 1998
UEFA Cup Finals
UEFA
UEFA Cup
Final
UEFA Cup Final
UEFA Cup Final